Suleman Khan may refer to:

 Suleman Khan (cricketer) (born 1983), Pakistani cricketer
 Suleman Khan (doctor) (1939–1971), Bangladesh physician
 Suleiman Khan
 Sulaiman Khan Karrani, Sultan of Bengal